The Nickelodeon Kids' Choice Awards, run annually on United States television since 1988, includes a category for "Favorite Female TV Star".

Winners and nominees
The winners are listed in bold.

Most wins
5 wins
Selena Gomez (5 consecutive)

4 wins
Amanda Bynes (4 consecutive)

3 wins 
Millie Bobby Brown (2 consecutive)
Alyssa Milano (3 consecutive)
Tia & Tamera Mowry (3 consecutive)
Zendaya

2 wins
Roseanne Barr (2 consecutive)
Miley Cyrus (2 consecutive)
Raven-Symoné (2 consecutive)
Olivia Rodrigo (2 consecutive)

Most nominations

10 nominations
Raven-Symoné

7 nominations
Miranda Cosgrove

6 nominations
Melissa Joan Hart

5 nominations
Jennifer Aniston
Roseanne Barr 
Miley Cyrus
Selena Gomez
Millie Bobby Brown
Hilary Duff (2 different roles)

4 nominations 
Amanda Bynes
Candace Cameron Bure
Kaley Cuoco
Kira Kosarin
Alyssa Milano (2 different roles) 
Tia & Tamera Mowry
Jamie Lynn Spears (2 different shows)
Zendaya 

3 nominations
Brandy 
Lizzy Greene
Victoria Justice
Bridgit Mendler
Debby Ryan
Olivia Rodrigo
Sofia Wylie

2 nominations
Kirstie Alley (2 different roles) 
Ella Anderson
Roseanne Arnold 
Chloe Bennet 
Dove Cameron 
Eve 
Sarah Michelle Gellar
Peyton List (2 different roles)
Jennifer Love Hewitt (2 different roles)
Laura Marano
Jennifer Morrison 
Queen Latifah
Emma Roberts
That Girl Lay Lay

Female Singer